François de Dinteville (1477–1530) was a French Catholic bishop.

After a legal training in Pavia as doctor of both laws, he became bishop of Sisteron in 1506. He was bishop of Auxerre from 1513 to his death. The Hours of François de Dinteville (1525) were acquired by the British Museum in 1852 and are now in the British Library.

His successor was another François de Dinteville, his nephew, who had been Bishop of Riez from 1527 to 1530. Dinteville the Younger held the diocese of Auxerre until his death on 27 September 1556.

References

External links
Biography

Bishops of Auxerre
Bishops of Sisteron
1530 deaths
1498 births